This is a comprehensive list of hospitals in Thailand. The list is sorted with Bangkok at the top, and then in the alphabetical order of the provinces.

Public Hospitals

Ministry of Public Health

Office of the Permanent Secretary
As of 2022, there were a total of 901 hospitals under the management of the Office of Permanent Secretary, separated into 34 regional, 92 general and 775 community hospitals. Bed count consists of beds that are available for inpatient admission only and does not include beds for temporary use, such as stretchers, beds in the emergency department, ICU, observation wards etc.

Regional Hospitals (Category A) 
These are the largest hospitals operated by the MOPH, located at major provincial cities. Almost all of these hospitals are also teaching hospitals.

General Hospitals (Category S and M1) 
These are slightly smaller hospitals compared to regional hospitals, located in smaller provincial towns. Some hospitals are also teaching hospitals.

Community Hospitals (Category M2, F1, F2 and F3) 
These are the smallest hospitals, serving single districts. Some hospitals act as teaching hospitals. Some hospitals do not have inpatient departments and operate with only outpatient and emergency departments. Bed counts in these hospitals are noted as '0'.

Department of Disease Control

Department of Medical Services

Department of Mental Health

Public Organisation

University Hospitals 
Includes only hospitals operated directly by a university. Most of these hospitals are among the largest in Thailand and offer extremely specialised medical services ("super-tertiary care") not available elsewhere. It is generally the final referral level for complicated and rare diseases.

Military and Police 
Operated by branches of the Royal Thai Armed Forces.

Bangkok Metropolitan Administration 
All hospitals are operated by the Medical Services Department, Bangkok Metropolitan Administration.

Thai Red Cross Society 
All hospitals are operated by the Thai Red Cross Society.

Other Governmental Ministries and Organisations

Private Hospitals 
As of March 2022, there were 404 private hospitals that are available for patient admission (400 single-entity hospitals), registered with the Medical Registration Division, Department of Health Service Support, the Ministry of Public Health. The list is in alphabetical order by hospital name, for each province which is again listed alphabetically.

See also
Health in Thailand
Hospitals in Thailand

References

Unless noted otherwise, the above listing and numbers of beds are taken from the following sources:

 Retrieved 30 May 2020.

Hospitals
Thailand
List
Thailand